Hindsiclava tippetti is a species of sea snail, a marine gastropod mollusk in the family Pseudomelatomidae, the turrids and allies.

Description
Original description: "Shell large for genus, elongate, with elevated spire; shell ornamented with numerous equal-sized axial and spiral cords that are arranged in cancellate pattern; intersection of axial and spiral cord producing large, rounded bead; early whorls with large beaded axial ribs; axial ribs are replaced with cancellate-beaded sculpture on later whorls; subsutural area with large, wide, raised band and channeled unsculptured area that corresponds to anal notch; anal notch wide, deep; aperture narrow; shell color dark brown with tan beads; early whorls and protoconch dark brown; interior of aperture brown."

The length of the shell varies between 27 mm and 75 mm.

Distribution
Locus typicus: "35 m. depth, Rosalind Bank, Honduras."

This species occurs in the Caribbean Sea off Honduras.

References

 Petuch, E.J. 1987. New Caribbean Molluscan Faunas.The Coastal Education and Research Foundation, Charlottesville, Virginia, 154 pp.
 B. Landau and C. Marques da Silva. 2010. Early Pliocene gastropods of Cubagua, Venezuela: Taxonomy, palaeobiogeography and ecostratigraphy. Palaeontos 19:1–221

External links
 
 
 Kabat, Alan R. "Donn Lloyd Tippett (January 14, 1924 – January 29, 2014)." American Conchologist 42.2 (2014).

tippetti
Gastropods described in 1987